Barm, also called ale yeast, is the foam or scum formed on the top of a fermenting liquid, such as beer, wine, or feedstock for spirits or industrial ethanol distillation. It is used to leaven bread, or set up fermentation in a new batch of liquor. Barm, as a leaven, has also been made from ground millet combined with must out of wine-tubs and is sometimes used in English baking as a synonym for a natural leaven (sourdough). Various cultures derived from barm, usually Saccharomyces cerevisiae, became ancestral to most forms of brewer's yeast and baker's yeast currently on the market. 

A barm cake is a soft, round, flattish bread roll from North West England, traditionally leavened with barm. In Ireland, barm is used in the traditional production of barmbrack, a fruited bread. 

Emptins, a homemade product similar to barm and usually made from hops or potatoes and the dregs of cider or ale casks, was a common leavener for those living in rural areas far from a brewery, distillery, or bakery from which they could source barm or yeast.

See also

Kaiser roll
Sour mash
Yeast in winemaking

References

Leavening agents